The Wide Field/Planetary Camera (WFPC) (pronounced as wiffpick (Operators of the WFPC1 were known as "whiff-pickers")) was a camera installed on the Hubble Space Telescope launched in April 1990 and operated until December 1993.  It was one of the instruments on Hubble at launch, but its functionality was severely impaired by the defects of the main mirror optics which afflicted the telescope.  However, it produced uniquely valuable high resolution images of relatively bright astronomical objects, allowing for a number of discoveries to be made by HST even in its aberrated condition.

WFPC was proposed by James A. Westphal, a professor of planetary science at Caltech, and was designed, constructed, and managed by JPL.  At the time it was proposed, 1976, CCDs had barely been used for astronomical imaging, though the first KH-11 KENNEN reconnaissance satellite equipped with CCDs for imaging was launched in December 1976. The high sensitivity offered such promise that many astronomers strongly argued that CCDs should be considered for Hubble Space Telescope instrumentation.

This first WFPC consisted of two separate cameras, each comprising 4 800x800 pixel Texas Instruments CCDs arranged to cover a contiguous field of view. The Wide Field camera had a 0.1 arcsecond per pixel resolution and was intended for the panoramic observations of faint sources at the cost of angular resolution.  The Planetary Camera had a 0.043 arcsecond per pixel resolution and was intended for high-resolution observations.  Selection between the two cameras was done with a four-facetted pyramid that rotated by 45 degrees.

As part of the corrective service mission (STS-61 in December 1993) the WFPC was swapped out for a replacement version. The Wide Field and Planetary Camera 2 improved on its predecessor and incorporated corrective optics needed to overcome the main mirror defect.  To avoid potential confusion, the WFPC is now most commonly referred to as WFPC1.

On its return to Earth, the WFPC was disassembled and parts of it were used in Wide Field Camera 3, which was installed in Hubble on May 14, 2009, as part of Servicing Mission 4, replacing WFPC2.

Specifications
 
The instrument had two different cameras within, the Wide Field and the Planetary Camera. The Wide Field camera had a wider field of view compared to the Planetary Camera.

Specifications
Detection range, light wavelengths 115 to 1000 nm
For the Wide Field Camera
Field of View 2.6 x 2.6 arcminutes
f/12.9 
For the Planetary Camera
Field of View 66 x 66 arcseconds
f/30 
Smallest pixel scale 0.043 arcsecond (unit of degree)

First light image

Replacement
Although there was nothing known to be wrong with this instrument, the spherical aberration in HST's mirror severely limited the performance.   
WFPC was replaced by the Wide Field and Planetary Camera 2 which included its own internal corrective optics.  WFPC2 was replaced by the Wide Field Camera 3 in 2009.  After return to Earth, WFPC was disassembled and its parts cannibalized to make WFC3.

See also
Wide Field and Planetary Camera 2
Wide Field Camera 3
Advanced Camera for Surveys
Cosmic Origins Spectrograph
Faint Object Camera
Faint Object Spectrograph
Goddard High Resolution Spectrograph
Near Infrared Camera and Multi-Object Spectrometer
Space Telescope Imaging Spectrograph

References

External links
Jupiter image by WFPC, 1991

Hubble Space Telescope instruments
Space imagers
Space hardware returned to Earth intact